Penn Dayton Badgley (born November 1, 1986) is an American actor. He is known for his roles as Dan Humphrey in The CW teen drama series Gossip Girl (2007–2012) and as Joe Goldberg in the Netflix thriller series You (2018–present). For Gossip Girl, he received six Teen Choice Award nominations, and for You, he earned MTV Movie & TV Award and Saturn Award nominations.

Badgley first became known for portraying Phillip Chancellor IV on the soap opera The Young and the Restless (2000–2001), which earned him a Young Artist Award nomination, and he followed this with roles in the comedy films John Tucker Must Die (2006) and Drive-Thru (2007). Badgley went on to appear in a number of films, such as the thriller The Stepfather (2009), the teen comedy-drama Easy A (2010), the financial thriller Margin Call (2011), the biographical film Greetings from Tim Buckley (2012) and the independent drama The Paper Store (2016). For Margin Call, he won an Independent Spirit Award.

In 2017 he married singer Domino Kirke, with whom he has two children.

Early life

Badgley was born on November 1, 1986, in Baltimore, Maryland, the son of Duff and Lynne Murphy Badgley. His father had worked as a newspaper reporter and then as a carpenter and home builder, and was the Green Party candidate for governor of Washington in 2008. An only child, Badgley attended Woolridge Elementary (where his mother served as a PTA president), before he transferred to St. Christopher's School in Richmond, Virginia. He attended Charles Wright Academy in Tacoma, Washington.

As a child, Badgley was involved with the Seattle Children's Theatre and the Pine Nut Players community theater in Monroe, Washington. His mother supported his acting efforts, and worked various jobs (later, beginning a business in jewelry design with Badgley's godmother, Jan Sneed). He stated that he "skipped high school altogether" and at age 14, he took a proficiency exam and began attending Santa Monica College. He was later accepted to the University of Southern California, but deferred admission due to contractual obligations, later enrolling for two years at Lewis & Clark College in Portland, Oregon.

Badgley is said to have been home schooled alongside Blake Lively, his future co-star and partner. His parents divorced when he was 12. He recalls having "wanted to make music... as a 12-year-old", and recorded an unreleased pop single in 1998, referring in an interview to the effort as "terrible" and "misguided".

Career
Badgley and his mother moved to California so that he could pursue an acting career, and he recalls, in an interview, departing for Los Angeles at age 11. He soon began doing voiceovers for children's radio stations in Hollywood. His first credit was voice work for the video games Mario Golf 64 and Mario Tennis 64 in 1999 and 2000. Badgley had his first screen acting credit on an episode of Will & Grace and he subsequently appeared on shows such as Daddio, The Brothers García, and What I Like About You. Badgley's first noticeable role was as Phillip Chancellor IV on the soap opera The Young and the Restless, which he portrayed from 2000 to 2001. He was nominated for the Young Artist Award for Best Performance in a Daytime Series in 2001 for his performance, which brought him recognition.

In 2002, Badgley starred in The WB's comedy-drama series Do Over as Joel Larsen, a 34-year-old man who gets a second chance to get his life right, thanks to a freakish accident that catapults him back to 1980 as a 14-year-old. He went on to star in two other WB series: The Mountain from 2004 to 2005, and The Bedford Diaries in 2006. Badgley's first major film credit was 2006's John Tucker Must Die, playing the role of Scott Tucker. In its opening weekend, the film grossed a total of $14.3 million, ranking third in the US box office results for that weekend. He later appeared in Drive-Thru, co-starring future castmate Leighton Meester.

In 2007, Badgley was cast in The CW's teen drama series Gossip Girl as Dan Humphrey, based on the book series of the same name by Cecily von Ziegesar. He initially turned down the role, but accepted after the producers struggled finding someone to fill the role. His performance as Dan Humphrey was praised by audiences and critics alike, and earned him six Teen Choice Award nominations over the show's run. Jason Gay of the Rolling Stone particularly complimented his characterization, writing that "while another actor may have played Dan as a blah straight man, Badgley imbued him with an occasionally obnoxious know-it-all-ness." In 2009, Badgley starred in the thriller film The Stepfather, a remake of the 1987 film, as the stepson of a serial killer.

Badgley next played Todd, the love interest of Emma Stone's character, in the 2010 teen comedy film Easy A, which was a critical and commercial success, earning him a Teen Choice Award nomination.  He next appeared in the financial thriller drama Margin Call in 2011, for which the ensemble cast was critically acclaimed; he won the Robert Altman Award for his performance, which is presented at the Independent Spirit Awards. Badgley portrayed Jeff Buckley in the 2012 biopic Greetings from Tim Buckley; the film follows the journey Buckley took in grappling with the legacy of his late musician father, Tim, leading up to and culminating with his 1991 performance of his father's songs. For the role, Badgley took guitar and vocal lessons. He joined the cast of Parts per Billion in December 2012, opposite Alexis Bledel and Teresa Palmer; the film was released in 2014. Also released in 2014 was Cymbeline, where he portrayed the orphan Posthumus.

Badgley and others formed a band and released a song titled "Easy" on SoundCloud under the name M O T H E R; the song quickly gained popularity and was posted on numerous blogs. The group changed the spelling to MOTHXR in 2015, citing a cease-and-desist from another band with a similar name. They promptly signed with the labels Kitsuné and Washington Square Music, the New York City-based subdivision of the Razor & Tie label, which led to MOTHXR releasing their debut album, Centerfold, on February 26, 2016.

Badgley had a recurring role in NBC's 2015 miniseries The Slap, based upon the Australian series of the same name, and had a minor role in the 2016 film Adam Green's Aladdin. Badgley won acclaim for his role in the independent film The Paper Store (2016), opposite Stef Dawson and Richard Kind, receiving Best Actor at Oxford International Film Festival and a Special Jury Mention at Manchester International Film Festival.

Badgley stars as Joe Goldberg in the Netflix series You, formerly Lifetime's television adaptation of the book of the same name since September 2018. His performance was lauded by critics, with IGN calling it his best performance and writing that Badgley was "doing some of his best, most unhinged work in the series. His charming nature and playful face are the perfect, twisted mask for the “Nice Guy With Control Issues” lurking underneath". Samantha Highfill from Entertainment Weekly included his performance in her predicted list of contenders for the 71st Primetime Emmy Awards. Badgley received a Saturn Award nomination for his performance.

In October 2019, Badgley was cast in the independent film Here Today opposite Billy Crystal and Tiffany Haddish, which was released in May 2021 to mixed reviews from critics. In 2023 Badgley stated he requested his character on "You" to have fewer sex scenes out of respect for his real life marriage.

Personal life
Badgley’s relationships included Gossip Girl co-star Blake Lively from 2007 to 2010, and actress Zoë Kravitz from 2011 to 2013. Badgley began dating singer Domino Kirke in 2014. He married Kirke in a New York courthouse on February 27, 2017, and became the stepfather of Kirke's son. In February 2020, Kirke and Badgley announced they were expecting their first child together. Their son was born in August 2020.

In an interview with Shadi Toloui-Wallace, Badgley described how the BP oil spill prompted his exploration into the connection between justice and spirituality, and led him to the rainforests of Colombia and the teachings of Baháʼu'lláh and the Baháʼí Faith. Badgley has been a member of the Baha'i Faith since 2015 and is an outspoken activist against the persecution of Baháʼís by the government of Iran.

In the media 

During the 2008 United States presidential election, Badgley supported Barack Obama. He and Blake Lively appeared in an Obama commercial as part of MoveOn's Youth Vote program, which aired during Gossip Girl on The CW, MTV, and Comedy Central.

In March 2010, the American Red Cross announced Badgley as a member of the National Celebrity Cabinet, a group of celebrities who promote Red Cross services. Badgley supported the Occupy Wall Street movement in 2011 and is an ally of the Black Lives Matter movement. He wants police brutality dialogue to include female victims, and supports LGBT rights.

In 2011, he was named one of People's "25 Beauties (and Hotties) at 25" and BuddyTV ranked him number 75 on its "TV's 100 Sexiest Men of 2011" list.

Filmography

Film

Television

Video games

Awards and nominations

Notes

References

External links

 
 

1986 births
20th-century American male actors
21st-century American male actors
American child singers
American male child actors
American male film actors
American male soap opera actors
American male television actors
Living people
Male actors from Baltimore
People from Chesterfield County, Virginia
Male actors from Seattle
Male feminists
21st-century American singers
American Bahá'ís
21st-century Bahá'ís
Converts to the Bahá'í Faith
St. Christopher's School (Richmond, Virginia) alumni